The COVID-19 pandemic was confirmed to have reached the U.S. state of Nevada on March 5, 2020. Because of concerns about coronavirus disease 2019 (COVID-19), Nevada governor Steve Sisolak declared a state of emergency on March 12, 2020. Four days later, Nevada reported its first death. On March 17, 2020, Sisolak ordered the closure of non-essential businesses in the state, to help prevent the spread of the coronavirus. Grocery stores were among the businesses considered essential, and restaurants were allowed to provide drive-thru, takeout, and delivery services. At the end of March 2020, Sisolak announced a 90-day moratorium on evictions and foreclosures for commercial and residential tenants. The moratorium would be extended several times over the next year.

Various protests were held against Sisolak's shutdown order beginning in April 2020. Las Vegas mayor Carolyn Goodman was also critical of the shutdown and its length, urging Sisolak to reopen the state. Goodman was widely criticized after suggesting that Las Vegas become a control group to test the effectiveness of social distancing. Nevada launched the first phase of its reopening on May 9, 2020. Restaurants, retailers, outdoor malls, and hair salons were among the businesses allowed to reopen, but with precautions in place, such as limiting occupancy to 50 percent. A second phase went into effect on May 29, 2020. It allowed for the reopening of state parks and businesses such as bars, gyms, and movie theaters. Casinos began reopening on June 4, 2020.

COVID-19 cases increased following the reopenings, and facial masks were mandated for residents at the end of June 2020. Bars in certain counties were closed the following month to help stop the rise in cases, and they gradually reopened over the next few months. In September 2020, Sisolak announced that live shows and conventions could resume with reduced attendance. Cases began to rise again in October 2020, following a decline in the months prior. COVID-19 vaccinations began at the end of 2020, and Sisolak reduced capacity for gatherings and various businesses to help stop the surge in cases. His latest measures were gradually eased starting in February 2021. Control over COVID-19 restrictions was transferred from the state to individual counties on May 1, 2021, and the mask mandate was briefly eased later that month for fully vaccinated residents. Cases and hospitalizations increased during mid-2021, due to vaccine hesitancy and the emergence of the SARS-CoV-2 Delta variant, which was more transmissible. The SARS-CoV-2 Omicron variant resulted in another surge beginning in December 2021. It subsided within a few months, and Sisolak ended the mask mandate in February 2022, amid a decrease in cases and hospitalizations.

The majority of cases and deaths have occurred in Clark County, which includes the Las Vegas Valley. Washoe County, which includes the Reno-Sparks area, is the second most-impacted county. , there have been 835,618 cases and 11,417 deaths reported in Nevada, and the state has fully vaccinated 1,782,408 residents.

Timeline

On March 5, 2020, Nevada reported its first case of coronavirus disease 2019 (COVID-19), in a resident from Las Vegas. Nevada governor Steve Sisolak declared a state of emergency one week later, because of concerns about the COVID-19 pandemic. He also formed a medical advisory team. Nevada reported its first COVID-19 death on March 16, 2020. A day later, Sisolak ordered non-essential businesses in the state to close for 30 days, to prevent the spread of the virus. Casinos were among businesses ordered to shut down. Las Vegas mayor Carolyn Goodman opposed the length of his shutdown order, and would become a critic of his actions during the pandemic, urging him to reopen the state.

The business closures went into effect on March 18, 2020, and were later extended. Grocery stores, hardware stores, pharmacies, banks, and gas stations were among businesses considered essential. Police, fire, and healthcare services continued operations as well, along with construction sites. In April 2020, Sisolak activated the Nevada National Guard to aid the state during the pandemic. Some Nevada residents held protests in opposition to his shutdown orders. Meanwhile, Goodman was heavily criticized for suggesting that Las Vegas become a control group to test the effectiveness of social distancing.

Phase one of the state's reopening began on May 9, 2020. It included restaurants and retailers, which could operate with precautions in place, such as 50-percent occupancy. Phase two went into effect on May 29, 2020. It included the reopening of bars, bowling alleys, gyms, movie theaters, pools, spas, state parks, and tattoo shops. Sisolak also increased public gathering limits to 50 people, up from an earlier limit of 10.

Casinos were allowed to reopen on June 4, 2020. Increased COVID-19 testing and the reopening of businesses contributed to a rise in cases later that month. Sisolak postponed plans for a phase three of reopening, and he instituted a face mask mandate at the end of the month.

COVID-19 cases declined during August and September 2020, but saw a resurgence beginning in October. Sisolak announced new restrictions in November 2020, amid a steep rise in cases. Certain businesses – including casinos, restaurants, bars, and gyms – had their operating capacity reduced to 25 percent. The limits on public and private gatherings were also reduced. COVID-19 vaccinations began in the state in December 2020, as Nevada saw record-high hospitalizations and one of the highest positivity rates in the U.S.

Cases and hospitalizations began to decline in January 2021, and Sisolak gradually scaled back his newest restrictions over the next two months. Control over pandemic restrictions was transferred from the state to local counties on May 1, 2021. With the exception of the mask mandate, Clark County ended all other restrictions on June 1, 2021. Cases and hospitalizations increased again in mid-2021, due to vaccine hesitancy and the emergence of the SARS-CoV-2 Delta variant, which was more transmissible. Another surge in cases began in December 2021, after the SARS-CoV-2 Omicron variant was detected in the state. By February 2022, cases and hospitalizations had begun to decrease again, prompting an end to the mask mandate. After more than two years, Sisolak declared an end to the state of emergency in May 2022.

Epidemiology and medical response
In early 2020, the state began preparing for a potential coronavirus outbreak. On March 22, 2020, Sisolak named Jim Murren to lead the state's COVID-19 Response, Relief & Recovery Task Force. In Clark County, the Southern Nevada Water Authority began monitoring sewage water in March 2020, to detect the virus and help predict areas where it could break out.

In June 2020, Clark County reported the state's first case of multisystem inflammatory syndrome in children (MIS-C), a disease that is caused by COVID-19. In August 2020, Nevada reported a case of COVID-19 reinfection in a 25-year-old man from Reno, who had tested positive for the virus twice, in April and June 2020. He was the first confirmed person in the U.S., and one of five worldwide, to become reinfected. As of April 2022, the state had more than 22,000 reported reinfections, out of approximately 700,000 cases. As of June 2022, reinfections accounted for approximately 14 percent of all cases in Nevada.

In January 2021, Las Vegas became the third U.S. city with a federally supported clinic offering bamlanivimab, a COVID-19 treatment. A European strain of COVID-19 initially made up the majority of cases in Nevada. Statewide, the SARS-CoV-2 Delta variant became the dominant strain of COVID-19 in mid-2021.

Testing
Nevada began COVID-19 testing on possible patients on January 29, 2020. The first positive case was reported five weeks later. In Las Vegas, UNLV Medicine opened a drive-thru testing site on March 23, 2020. The facility saw high demand from residents seeking a test. In April 2020, Sisolak said the state had received 3,000 reagent kits and 4,000 test swabs from the federal government. Although he appreciated the testing items, he said they "are not nearly the volume necessary for us to perform the desired amount of testing that we want and our citizens want." Later that month, UNLV Medicine announced plans to work with the National Guard to expand its testing operation. More than 3,000 residents of southern Nevada had been tested up to that time. University Medical Center (UMC) in Las Vegas also announced plans to substantially increase its testing efforts. At the end of the month, plans were being finalized to start widespread testing in southern Nevada.

In May 2020, the Nevada Department of Corrections reported that there had yet to be any cases among inmates. However, these results were considered questionable, as only 56 inmates had been tested out of nearly 12,500. Within a month, prison testing had increased to 54 percent of all state inmates. In addition, 825 prison employees had also been tested. Seven inmates and 30 employees had tested positive up to that time, with no deaths resulting from the virus.

During the pandemic-related closure of casinos, the parking garages of several resorts were utilized as drive-thru testing sites. Among these was the Orleans hotel-casino in the Las Vegas Valley. It was the first testing site there to offer tests regardless of whether or not people had any symptoms. The testing site was a joint effort between Clark County, the Nevada National Guard, and UMC. The Orleans site tested 14,000 people during its three-week run in May 2020, before relocating to a parking garage at University of Nevada, Las Vegas (UNLV), where walk-up visits and child testing were allowed.

In May 2020, drive-thru testing sites opened at Wal-Mart stores across Nevada, part of the effort to add more testing sites across the state. Such sites continued to increase as more test kits became available, and cases of coronavirus were expected to rise as more sites opened. UMC began testing casino employees at the Las Vegas Convention Center, ahead of the casino re-openings. The convention center was capable of testing up to 4,000 people a day. At the end of May 2020, UMC began testing all of its patients for COVID-19, becoming the first hospital in Nevada to do so. UMC had the ability to perform 10,000 tests per day, the highest in the state.

In August 2020, an epidemiologist for the state's COVID-19 task force noted a seven-percent decrease in the number of tests being performed, compared to a month earlier. Possible explanations included decreased transmission of the virus, and people becoming frustrated with the testing process due to delays in getting appointments and test results. At the end of the month, Clark County launched a temporary COVID-19 testing campaign, which aimed to test 60,000 people over several weeks at drive-thru test sites. The county sent out an emergency alert to mobile computers, urging residents to participate in the testing campaign. As of September 2020, UMC had processed 320,000 COVID-19 tests, approximately one-third of all tests performed in the state.

In late 2021, Chicago-based NorthShore Clinical Labs was hired to provide testing for young athletes in Washoe County. However, an investigation found the tests to be defective, missing 96 percent of positive cases. In January 2022, Sisolak announced that the state had purchased nearly 600,000 at-home tests which would be distributed to residents, in an effort to meet high demand for testing.

Mask policy

Stores in Las Vegas began running out of facial masks in January 2020, as residents started purchasing them out of concern. Nevada initially did not issue a mask mandate for its residents, although Sisolak, in April 2020, advised residents to wear facial coverings while in public. Sisolak said he did not mandate such a policy because he believed that no mandate would result in more residents doing so voluntarily: "I think it's a matter of people not wanting to be told what to do." He also noted that such a mandate had already been made by Ohio governor Mike DeWine, who had to rescind the mandate following outrage from residents there. Mayor Goodman opposed a mask mandate, believing the decision should be left up to residents and businesses.

When businesses began to reopen in May 2020, employees were required to wear masks. At the time, Sisolak said that many residents were wearing them, but that some businesses were not complying as required. Sisolak urged the public to wear masks, and said that businesses refusing to do the same would face punishment. Sisolak said, "Our goal is to continue reopening more of Nevada's economy in a safe and responsible manner. What we do now will determine what we can do next. That's why compliance is so extremely important."

In June 2020, it was reported that many visitors to the Las Vegas Strip were not wearing face masks. Simultaneously, the Nevada Gaming Control Board ordered that players and spectators of table games must wear masks if the table does not have protective barriers installed. The board cited declines in mask usage by patrons as justification for the change in policy. As cases continued to rise during June, Sisolak asked his COVID-19 advisory team to review enhanced policies regarding face masks for the public. The Culinary union said it would take legal action unless gaming properties implemented more COVID-19 safety measures to protect workers, including a mask requirement for all casino guests and employees.

On June 24, 2020, Sisolak ordered that face coverings must be worn in all public spaces, effective two days later. The Las Vegas Convention and Visitors Authority promoted the new requirement as part of a public service campaign. Mask exemptions were allowed for children under the age of 10, and people with certain medical conditions. Businesses were required to enforce mask-wearing among customers. In Las Vegas, it was reported that most people were following the mask mandate.

However, an analysis of 150,000 Twitter messages also found that Nevada was the second most-resistant state for mask-wearing, with Arizona in the top spot. A political action committee called No Mask Nevada was formed to oppose the mask mandate and hold protests against it. Sisolak called the protests "ridiculous". In July 2020, Las Vegas began sending "compliance ambassadors" to businesses to educate them about the mask mandate. The ambassador team consisted of city staff members who had been reassigned. The workers would not enforce the mandate, but would report violations to the city. Las Vegas city council member Michele Fiore proposed the elimination of the compliance ambassador program, referring to the program's team members as snitches. The measure failed to pass the council. As COVID-19 cases increased, mask restrictions were expanded in November 2020, requiring gym-goers and people in private gatherings to wear masks at all times.

On May 4, 2021, in accordance with current CDC guidance, masks became optional for the fully-vaccinated when in outdoor public spaces. In accordance with a later update to the CDC guidance, the state lifted its mask mandate in indoor public spaces for those who are fully-vaccinated.

On July 27, 2021, Sisolak reinstated the mask mandate for indoor public spaces in all counties deemed to have "high" or "substantial" transmission rates, with no exception for the vaccinated. The state would review new infection rate data on a weekly basis, and each affected county would need to see a two-week drop in cases for the mask mandate to be lifted. On August 16, Sisolak issued an emergency directive for large indoor ticketed gatherings of more than 4,000 participants in counties with "high" or "substantial" transmission, stating that those that are fully-vaccinated are not required to wear a mask at such gatherings, provided that admission to the event is restricted to those who have received at least one vaccine dose. If proof of vaccination is not enforced, all attendees must wear a mask in compliance with the reinstated health order. Following the discovery of the Omicron variant, the state announced that the mask mandate would continue into early 2022, for areas with a high risk of transmission. Sisolak lifted the mandate on February 10, 2022, citing decreased cases and hospitalizations. Masks were still required on public transportation and in federal facilities. Nevada was among the last states to have an indoor mask mandate.

Hospitals
Hospitals began postponing elective surgeries in mid-March 2020, to help prevent the spread of COVID-19. A week later, Sisolak said the state did not currently have enough ventilators to fight the virus. At the time, Nevada had 718 ventilators, 32% of which were already in use. In addition, Las Vegas was at risk for its acute care beds being overwhelmed by coronavirus patients. By early April 2020, southern Nevada was experiencing the highest percentage of usage for hospital beds and ventilators, compared to the rural communities of northern Nevada. Clark County, in coordination with UMC, announced a backup plan to convert the Las Vegas Convention Center into a low-level hospital for 900 patients, in the event that actual hospitals become overwhelmed by patients with the coronavirus. Nursing homes took precautions against the virus, but eventually saw a rise in cases.

During April 2020, a company called Unacast looked at data from each state and ranked them based on how well they were practicing social distancing. Nevada was ranked at number one, with a "B+" grade. Data from the Nevada Hospital Association, for the month of April, showed that the state's hospitals were never in any danger of being overwhelmed by coronavirus patients, as social distancing diminished the virus' effect on the state population.

California loaned 50 ventilators to Nevada through May 1, 2020, at which point there was no longer a need for the additional units. Elective surgeries resumed in Nevada on May 4, 2020, with COVID-19 precautions in place. A month later, it was reported that hospitals in the state could suffer financially as a result of fewer patient visits during the pandemic. State hospitalizations saw a steep increase at the end of 2020, and some hospitals in southern Nevada began postponing elective surgeries once again. As of 2021, only one hospital in the state had an ECMO oxygen machine for treating the sickest patients: Sunrise Hospital & Medical Center in the Las Vegas Valley.

Contact tracing
On June 1, 2020, Sisolak announced plans to significantly increase contact tracing in the state. The effort would include the hiring of 250 workers. In August 2020, Nevada unveiled a contact tracing mobile app for the public. The following month, the state announced that 26 percent of residents had caught or spread COVID-19 while visiting a motel, a hotel, or a resort. The data was incomplete and was only based on people who had spoken with disease investigators. In Clark County, hotel-casinos presented the highest risk for possible exposure. In Washoe County, top places with COVID-19 cases included the Giga Nevada factory, Renown Health facilities, University of Nevada, Reno, and casinos. The state had previously been reluctant to identify superspreading events and locations that were known to rapidly spread COVID-19. Contact tracing efforts were reduced in December 2020, amid a rise in cases which largely nullified such efforts. The state also launched an additional contact tracing app, Exposure Notifications Express.

Vaccines
In September 2020, Sisolak signed a directive allowing state pharmacy technicians to administer the eventual COVID-19 vaccines, once they became available. The directive would ensure a quick and efficient method for vaccinating the public. The following month, Nevada joined other western states in a plan to review and approve the eventual vaccines, separate from the federal government's approval process.

Nevada and other U.S. states began vaccinating the public on December 14, 2020, using the Pfizer–BioNTech COVID-19 vaccine. Doses of Moderna's vaccine began arriving in the state one week later for immediate use. Because Moderna's vaccine can be stored at higher temperatures, it was considered better for rural areas of the state, where extremely cold storage conditions would be harder to achieve. Both vaccines required two doses. Earlier in the year, Las Vegas was among areas in the U.S. where Moderna had conducted a study for its vaccine, due to the city's high number of cases.

Nursing home staff and residents, as well as hospital staff and law enforcement, were among the first to receive the vaccines. Early on, Nevada was ranked by the Centers for Disease Control as the worst U.S. state for vaccine doses administered for every 100,000 people. One reason for this was uncertainty regarding the arrival of each vaccine shipment, something that occurred on an inconsistent basis. Nevada received low numbers of vaccine doses considering its population count. Doses were distributed proportionately to each state, based on population data from the American Community Survey, conducted a few years earlier. Nevada had seen significant growth in recent years, and because the population figures were outdated, the state wound up getting a low number of doses that did not correspond with its current population.

As of February 2021, the state had administered 500,000 doses, including first and second doses. The single-dose Janssen vaccine became available in Nevada in March 2021. Vaccinations for the general public, aged 16 and up, began on April 6, 2021. By that time, the concept of vaccine passports had been introduced in Las Vegas. The state briefly suspended use of the Janssen vaccine in April 2021, after six U.S. residents – including a Nevada woman – developed blood clots. Simultaneously, fewer Nevada residents were choosing to get vaccinated. Vaccination rates were particularly low among Latino residents, prompting organizations to launch a campaign which included Spanish-language billboards and pop-up clinics in Hispanic areas.

In June 2021, Sisolak introduced a vaccine incentive program that would take place over the next two months. Vaccinated residents would be eligible for prizes, with a new winner announced each week leading up to a grand prize of $1 million. The program, financed by federal relief funds, would have nearly 2,000 prizes worth a total of $5 million. Clark County also approved a pilot program to pay a $100 incentive to 1,000 residents to get vaccinated. The program was successful, leading to a renewal.

On August 20, 2021, the state reported that 50 percent of its eligible population had been fully vaccinated. By that time, proof of vaccination had become increasingly common for entry into sports events and entertainment venues, as well as college attendance. That month, the state required its 27,000 employees to either become vaccinated or get tested weekly. Vaccine mandates were subsequently announced for some government employees, including those working in health care and prison facilities. Some employees threatened to quit rather than become vaccinated, although the state did not expect this to be a major issue. The four-month vaccine mandate, which also applied to college students, expired at the end of 2021. As of August 2022, Nevada had one of the lowest COVID-19 vaccination rates in the U.S for children under the age of five.

Statistics
In Nevada, COVID-19 was responsible for more deaths in April 2020 than those caused by flu and pneumonia in the same month during 2018 and 2019. In May 2020, the Southern Nevada Health District announced that of the 5,000-plus cases in Clark County, Hispanics accounted for 27 percent of the cases, becoming the hardest-hit ethnic group in the county. Hispanics make up 31 percent of the population in Clark County. In July 2020, health officials announced the results of an antibody study conducted in the Reno-Sparks area during the previous month. The study found that COVID-19 testing was largely undercounting the actual number of positive cases, concluding that four to five times more people had likely been infected. As of September 2020, approximately four percent of cases had occurred in children under age 10, with one death occurring in the age group. People between the ages of 10 and 19 made up nine percent of cases and accounted for two deaths. As of March 2021, 63 percent of deaths had occurred in people age 70 and older.

Impact

Bars and restaurants

Bars were among the non-essential businesses to close on March 18, 2020. Restaurants were closed for dine-in patrons but were allowed to provide drive-thru, takeout, and delivery services. A week after the closures, Clark County started allowing restaurants to sell alcohol through a temporary permit. The permit only applied to restaurants with bars, and was only valid for patrons who placed food orders for curbside pick-up.

Restaurants reopened for dine-in on May 9, 2020, as part of the state's phase one of business reopenings. Restaurants were limited to 50 percent of their usual capacity. A few days after the reopenings, the Nevada Gaming Control Board announced that restaurants inside casinos could reopen as part of phase one, on the condition that customers do not have to cross the casino floor to get to the restaurants and restrooms. Another condition, applying to large counties, would be to limit crowding among customers who are waiting to enter. Sisolak said the reopening of casino restaurants was primarily meant to benefit small communities such as Ely – where dining options are limited – rather than places like Las Vegas. Sisolak was convinced to allow the reopening of such restaurants after rural communities urged him to do so. Restaurants in downtown Las Vegas were also allowed to extend dining to sidewalks.

Standalone bars were allowed to reopen on May 29, 2020, as part of phase two, while casinos reopened a week later. QR codes allowed casino customers to get on a wait-list for restaurants and bars. Such codes were also used to provide restaurant menus on customers' cell phones. Buffets – a loss leader for casinos and a popular concept in Las Vegas – remained closed as they had yet to receive approval from the state to reopen. Some buffets soon reopened without self-service, utilizing other methods such as waiter service or to-go orders.

On July 10, 2020, because of a rise in new coronavirus cases, Sisolak ordered the closure of bars in seven counties: Clark, Elko, Humboldt, Lander, Lyon, Nye, and Washoe. A few days later, 37 bars in Clark County filed a lawsuit against Sisolak's shutdown order regarding such establishments. The suit alleged that bars were being treated differently than other non-essential businesses, and stated that bars were largely in compliance with safety procedures. Two weeks after the lawsuit was filed, Sisolak announced that bars in three rural counties – Lander, Lyon, and Humboldt – would be allowed to reopen immediately. Sisolak expressed regret about the mass closing of bars in the state and said, "In hindsight, I don't know if that was the fairest way to do it," stating that many bars were in compliance with satefy guidelines.

In August 2020, a judge ruled in favor of Sisolak's shutdown order on bars. Meanwhile, Sisolak put the state's COVID-19 task force in charge of decisions about when to reopen the remaining bars; they resumed business the following month. In November 2020, bar and restaurant capacity was reduced to 25 percent due to a rise in COVID-19 cases. In addition, restaurants could no longer accept walk-in diners and were only allowed to serve guests with a reservation. Restaurant capacity was gradually increased to 50 percent during early 2021.

Casinos

Like other non-essential businesses, casinos closed on March 18, 2020. The statewide closure affected 440 casinos, as well as 1,977 businesses that operated small casinos with 15 slot machines or less, such as supermarkets, restaurants and convenience stores. It marked the first time that casinos on the Las Vegas Strip had been shut down since the state funeral of John F. Kennedy in 1963. Like Las Vegas, Mesquite's economy is also dependent largely on tourism and casinos, and was harmed by the impact of the pandemic closures.

In early May 2020, some casinos began offering drive-thru sports betting services. Meanwhile, the Nevada Gaming Commission gave unanimous and final approval to guidelines created by the Nevada Gaming Control Board, allowing casinos to eventually reopen with reduced occupancy and increased sanitation.

Questions remained unanswered regarding the impending reopening of casinos in Las Vegas. The Culinary Workers Union held protests, demanding information on how casino companies planned to prevent the spread of COVID-19 and keep people safe. Further protests, regarding the murder of George Floyd, took place in Nevada at the end of May 2020, resulting in riots as well as clashes between protestors and authorities. It was believed that the George Floyd protests could have a negative impact on the reopening of casinos in Las Vegas due to the resulting civil unrest, something that would not attract tourists. Prior to that point, the reopening of casinos showed a pent-up demand, leading some casino companies to expand the number of properties that would reopen on the Las Vegas Strip on June 4. In response to the protests, the Las Vegas Convention and Visitors Authority cancelled an advertising campaign that would have promoted the reopening of casinos.

Select casinos began reopening as scheduled on June 4, 2020, after a closure of 78 days. Various safety measures were put in place at casinos. Employees were required to wear masks, and guests were encouraged to do so too. Free masks were offered to guests. Guests' temperatures were taken at casino entrances, and those with a fever would be checked again in 15 minutes to ensure whether the initial temperature-check was accurate. Those with a confirmed fever would be moved to a temporary holding area for health questioning and would not be allowed to enter the rest of the casino. In Las Vegas, those who tested positive for coronavirus would be moved to one of the 10 hotels in the area that accepted such guests. Seating was limited at table games, and in some casinos, plexiglass shields were installed on gaming tables and at hotel lobbies. Hand-washing stations were set up on the casino floor in some resorts, and every other slot machine was inactive in order to promote social distancing. Las Vegas casino resorts offered discounted rooms and various promotions to attract guests. Some properties also suspended their resort and parking fees. Las Vegas casino companies reported a strong demand, more so than previously expected.

Within a month of reopening, employees at multiple Las Vegas resorts – including the Cosmopolitan – became concerned that safety precautions were not being properly exercised. Workers were also upset that casino companies withheld the number of employees who tested positive for coronavirus, although they are not required to provide such information to their workers. The Cosmopolitan was later found to be a top location for possible exposure to COVID-19.

Motorists from California and Arizona made up the majority of revenue for the Las Vegas Strip during the pandemic. Some Las Vegas Strip resorts began operating only on weekends, due to weak demand. Casino capacity was reduced from 50 to 25 percent in November 2020, amid the rise in COVID-19 cases. Up to that time, locals casinos in Las Vegas had performed better than those on the Strip, where resorts are dependent on tourists. As of early 2021, the number of poker tables in Clark County had decreased 33 percent from a year earlier, a result of the pandemic. Casino capacity was gradually brought back to 50 percent during early 2021. At the time, there were 13 casinos across the state that had yet to reopen.

Economy and finances

Nevada, especially Las Vegas, is dependent on tourism. A study in April 2020 found that Nevada's economy was the second most vulnerable in the United States, as 17 percent of its GDP relied on tourism. Another analysis found that the state was most likely to be hit hardest by the economic impact of the virus. The American Hotel and Lodging Association reported that among U.S. states, Nevada would have the fourth lowest state and local tax revenue for 2020, losing an estimated $1.1 billion.

On May 11, 2020, Sisolak declared a fiscal state of emergency due to COVID-19's impact on the economy. The declaration would allow the state to use money from a $400 million emergency fund. A month later, as a result of the financial problems, Sisolak proposed changes to the state budget, which included the furlough of all state employees for one day each month beginning in July. He also announced that salary increases would be subject to a pause. These measures would ensure that less than 50 employees would be laid off. Nevada faced a $900 million deficit for the budget year ending June 30, and a $1.3 billion deficit for the next year. The Nevada Legislature approved Sisolak's proposed budget cuts, which totaled $116 million. For 2020, Nevada tourism dropped to its lowest level since 1993. The Las Vegas tourism industry lost an estimated $34 billion in 2020, and the city's economy is not expected to make a full recovery until some time between 2022 and 2024.

Events and live entertainment
Various events, including concerts and shows, were postponed or canceled as a result of the pandemic. In Las Vegas, an ASEAN summit was postponed in February 2020, followed by the cancellations of large events such as the Global Gaming Expo, the Consumer Electronics Show, the AVN Awards, and the Electric Daisy Carnival. Burning Man, an event held annually in the Black Rock Desert, was also canceled.

In Las Vegas, live musical entertainment was largely prohibited, except for ambient music. Promotion and ticket sales for such entertainment were not allowed, and dancing was also prohibited. Two long-running Las Vegas shows, Le Rêve and Zumanity, closed permanently as a result of the pandemic. At the end of September 2020, Sisolak announced new guidelines which would allow for the return of live shows and conventions, with reduced capacity. Showrooms and theaters would have to submit safety plans, and such venues would be limited to either 250 people or 50-percent capacity, whichever is less. Large shows faced the difficulty of making a profit with such reduced capacity. Stadiums were allowed to admit 10 percent of their usual capacity, and conventions were allowed to proceed with a 1,000-person limit. The changes were considered to be among the most significant advances since the start of the pandemic. Officials in the entertainment industry applauded Sisolak's relaxing of COVID-19 restrictions. In response to an increase in the number of cases, Sisolak issued new restrictions in November 2020 that limited capacity for many venues.

In March 2021, the state reduced the minimum distance required between performers and audience members, allowing for a broader return of shows. Later that month, the Las Vegas entertainment industry showed improvement, with 39 shows playing throughout the area. However, this was down from an average of 150 shows prior to the pandemic.

Housing and commercial tenants
On March 29, 2020, Sisolak announced a 90-day moratorium on evictions and foreclosures for commercial and residential tenants, saying, "This is not the time to put people out on the streets. This is also not the time to evict small business owners who have been hit by the economic fallout of this pandemic." Three months later, Sisolak announced that the moratorium would gradually be lifted. Owners of commercial space could begin evictions again on July 1, 2020, while certain residential evictions could resume a month later in the event that the eviction process began prior to the moratorium's issuance. Other residential evictions would begin on September 1, 2020.

In the Las Vegas Valley, a housing assistance program was launched by the city and county to provide financial aid to renters and mortgage owners who had been affected by the COVID-19 pandemic. The program was funded through the CARES Act. In addition, the Clark County Commission unanimously passed an emergency ordinance in August 2020 to protect certain renters from discrimination. The new measure made it illegal for landlords to refuse rental to people who have been financially impacted by the pandemic. A report from the month prior had found that up to 142,000 households (327,000 tenants, or 25 percent of the state's renting population) could face difficulty paying rent by September 2020. The ordinance was set to expire on December 31, 2020.

Despite the pandemic, Las Vegas home prices reached record highs starting in mid-2020. Sales also increased, and planned communities in the area were among the top-selling in the country during the first half of 2020. The Las Vegas housing boom continued into mid-2021, and was attributed to low mortgage rates. However, Nevada had also seen an increase in mortgage delinquencies since the start of the pandemic.

Sisolak announced a 45-day extension of the residential moratorium on August 31, 2020. This would provide counties and the state government more time to fully implement programs – including short-term rental assistance – which would help landlords and residents. Landlords were critical of Sisolak for extending the moratorium only one day before its expiration, although he and his staff members had tried to avoid an extension. Despite the extension, landlords were still allowed to begin charging late fees for missed rent, and could also initiate no-cause evictions. In September 2020, the Centers for Disease Control (CDC) issued a nationwide eviction moratorium. Some Las Vegas landlords proceeded with evictions despite the CDC order, citing financial losses. In December 2020, as the CDC order approached its expiration, Sisolak reinstated the state's eviction moratorium for three and a half months. He extended the moratorium again until the end of May 2021, while stating that there would be no further extensions. The state subsequently passed a bill to protect renters facing eviction.

Religion

On April 8, 2020, Sisolak restricted religious gatherings of 10 people or more. Three weeks later, he announced that churches could begin offering drive-in services. On May 25, 2020, the United States Department of Justice Civil Rights Division informed Sisolak that his 10-person ban on churches could be a violation of the Free Exercise Clause, stating that churches in Nevada were not being treated equal with other businesses such as restaurants, which were allowed to operate at 50-percent capacity rather than a 10-person limit. Eric Dreiband, the head of the government agency, said, "We understand these directives were issued in the midst of an uncertain situation, which may have required quick decisions based on changing information. We are concerned, however, that the flat prohibition against 10 or more persons gathering for in-person worship services — regardless of whether they maintain social distancing guidelines — impermissibly treats religious and nonreligious organizations unequally." A day later, Sisolak announced that religious facilities could resume in-person services with a 50-person limit and with social distancing in place.

In July 2020, the Supreme Court of the United States ruled in a 5-to-4 decision that Sisolak had the right to limit church gatherings to 50 people. The decision came after a church in Lyon County challenged Sisolak's order. The church noted that other businesses – including bowling alleys, gyms, salons, and water parks – were allowed to operate at 50-percent capacity rather than a 50-person limit. A federal appeals court overturned Sisolak's 50-person church restriction in December 2020, allowing for 25 percent capacity instead. The ruling was based on a new decision issued by the U.S. Supreme Court. Churches were allowed to operate at 35 percent capacity starting in February 2021.

Rural areas
On March 16, 2020, Eureka County announced immediate closures of certain facilities to protect its citizens from COVID-19. In addition, all non-essential travel of Eureka County employees was suspended. County employees worked from home for the next month, before resuming in-person work at public offices, with safety precautions such as social distancing.

Nye County reported its first case on March 18, 2020, followed a week later by the city of Mesquite in Clark County. Humboldt and White Pine County reported their first cases in late March 2020, followed in early April by Tonopah, located in Nye County. At that time, Humboldt County had 14 cases, the second-most per capita of any county in Nevada, with less than 17,000 residents. The county's health officer said that many residents were not taking the coronavirus seriously. Humboldt County reported its first death later that month.

During April 2020, seven rural counties had yet to report any cases: Churchill, Esmeralda, Eureka, Lander, Lincoln, Mineral, and Pershing. This number dropped to three counties the following month. Eureka County announced its first COVID-19 case in June 2020. As of July, the city of Ely in White Pine County had experienced only a handful of cases and no deaths, both of which were attributed to its remote location in the state. In addition, the nearby Robinson Mine and Ely State Prison continued operations during the pandemic, which lessened the economic impact in Ely. Laughlin, with its casinos and outdoor activities, was able to rely on tourism to keep its economy going. Esmeralda County, with 974 residents, was one of the few counties in the U.S. without a COVID-19 case, until November 2020.

COVID-19 cases had remained low in rural areas during mid-2020, although private gatherings were responsible for a majority of new cases later in the year. Rural residents experienced delays in receiving COVID-19 test results, waiting up to six days in certain areas. Some rural counties were resistant to Sisolak's COVID-19 orders, with residents citing their desire for personal freedom. White Pine County passed a resolution that allowed the local sheriff and district attorney to choose when to enforce Sisolak's directives. A $50,000 county fund was also established to pay the fines for businesses that violate such directives. In addition, COVID-19 enforcement inspectors from OSHA and the Nevada Gaming Control Board were required to quarantine for 14 days upon arriving in White Pine County. Lyon County declared an economic emergency and passed a similar resolution in January 2021, giving local businesses the option to ignore Sisolak's restrictions. Elko and Eureka County also passed resolutions calling for Sisolak to end business and gathering restrictions in rural Nevada.

Schools
On March 15, 2020, Sisolak ordered the closure of the state's schools for three weeks. In April 2020, he announced that schools would remain closed through the spring. Following the school closures, children were educated through online distance learning. Schools throughout the state began providing free student meals for pick-up, to help families who were unable to afford food.

As of mid-2020, Esmeralda County remained free of coronavirus and was planning to resume in-person schooling, unlike large cities in the state. Sisolak said that decisions on how to educate children would be left up to individual school districts, noting, "The number of students that are in a school in Lovelock is nowhere near the number of students in a classroom in Clark or Washoe (counties). They're different. Everybody's different, and that needs to be taken into account."

Clark County
Mayor Goodman disagreed with Sisolak's closure decision, as she wanted schools in Las Vegas to remain open, with people assigned to all entrances to check the temperatures of students. After the closures, the Clark County School District (CCSD) provided free Chromebook computers to students who did not have access to a computer.

For the 2020–21 school year, CCSD stated that it was better-prepared for online learning compared to earlier in the year. The district installed software to monitor students' online activity and keep them focused on schoolwork. CCSD began the new school year in August 2020, through online learning. However, students and teachers initially encountered technical issues due to the high number of users. A group of more than 100 people subsequently protested against CCSD over its use of distance learning and its impact on special-needs children. Shortly before the resumption of school, eight parents had filed a federal class action lawsuit against CCSD, alleging that the latter failed to provide appropriate education for their special-needs children, as required by the Individuals with Disabilities Education Act. The district had 42,000 special-education students.

In the Las Vegas Valley, some private schools resumed in-person learning for the new school year, causing concern that such students would receive an unfair advantage over online learners. Some rural CCSD schools also resumed in-person learning. The prolonged closures of most CCSD schools led to an increased number of student suicides, pushing the school district to expedite its full reopening. For students in grades K through third, CCSD began a hybrid format on March 1, 2021, with two days of in-person learning and three days of distance learning. Older students gradually began hybrid learning over the next five weeks. Clark County was the last Nevada county to reopen its schools. CCSD resumed in-person classes again for the 2021–22 school year.

Washoe County
The Washoe County School District (WCSD) began the new school year in August 2020, through a combination of in-person and online classes. However, a month earlier, the Washoe County Health District had recommended against in-person learning, citing the high infection rate in the area. In addition, more than 100 Washoe County teachers had protested against school reopenings, stating that the facilities were not adequately prepared and that pandemic conditions were not yet safe for in-person learning. Hundreds of Washoe County teachers – those most at risk for dying from COVID-19 – applied for distance learning accommodations, allowing them to safely teach from home. Shortly after the reopening of schools in Washoe County, 600 students were excluded from in-person classes because of various instances of possible contact with COVID-19.

Sex industry
The state's legal brothels, as well as strip clubs, were ordered to close in March 2020. Sex workers began offering escort and in-call service, but the legality of this was ambiguous. In October 2020, a Nevada sex worker sued Sisolak over the closure of the state's brothels, calling it unconstitutional and arbitrary. A county judge declined the worker's petition to reopen Nevada's brothels, and she subsequently dropped her lawsuit against Sisolak, due to financial limitations. Brothels and strip clubs were allowed to reopen on May 1, 2021.

Sports

On March 12, the National Hockey League suspended the season for an indefinite amount of time, affecting the Vegas Golden Knights. The NHL listed Las Vegas and T-Mobile Arena as a candidate to be one of two "hub cities" to centralize play of the 2020 Stanley Cup playoffs, but ultimately lost to Rogers Place Edmonton and Scotiabank Centre Toronto.

The Pac-12 Conference halted its men's basketball tournament being held at T-Mobile Arena the same day.

The National Football League cancelled festivities in Las Vegas for the 2020 NFL Draft (which were to be hosted by the Las Vegas Raiders with festivities on the Las Vegas Strip), conducting the entirety of the draft remotely. Las Vegas was re-awarded the 2022 draft. The Las Vegas Raiders' inaugural season will be played behind closed doors with no spectators admitted.

In late-May 2020, the Nevada Athletic Commission approved the first combat sports events to be held in Las Vegas since the beginning of the pandemic, with UFC hosting the first event—UFC on ESPN: Woodley vs. Burns—on May 30, followed by UFC 250, on a closed set at UFC's Apex studios in Las Vegas. It also approved two Top Rank-promoted boxing cards being broadcast by ESPN (beginning with Shakur Stevenson vs. Felix Caraballo on June 9), with these and future events being hosted in a closed studio in an MGM Grand conference hall, with a protected "bubble" having been constructed to secure the boxers and essential staff.

In Las Vegas, NASCAR races resumed in September 2020, without live audiences. The following month, certain youth sports were allowed to resume across the state.

Unemployment
On March 18, 2020, Sisolak announced that he had instructed the Nevada Department of Employment, Training and Rehabilitation (DETR) to make it easier for people to receive unemployment benefits. Early the next month, Sisolak acknowledged residents' frustration with their inability to contact DETR. Thousands of unemployed people had difficulty getting in contact with the agency, due to the high number of phone calls being made to it. Sisolak said, "We do not have the structure in place, I can assure you of this, to process this kind of volume. This department has never received the funding that it should have received. You could never expect a surge in claims anything like what we're dealing with right now." Sisolak said a complete revamp of the state's unemployment system would not be undertaken, saying it would temporarily prevent residents from filing and would be more harmful than beneficial. In mid-April 2020, DETR opened a new call center to help deal with unemployment issues. It was operated by the international company Alorica. DETR's director resigned at the end of the month, and Sisolak named Heather Korbulic as a replacement.

At the end of April 2020, approximately 350,000 Nevada residents had filed for unemployment benefits, setting a record that was twice as many as the number during the Great Recession. Less than two weeks later, DETR reported a record-high state unemployment rate of 22 percent, up from 4 percent in February 2020. Despite complaints about customer service, DETR paid unemployment claims faster than most states during the early months of the pandemic.

On May 12, 2020, two Reno women filed a lawsuit against DETR, which lacked a system that would allow self-employed residents to file for unemployment benefits under the CARES Act. Nevada was the only state in the United States that did not have such a system in place, although plans were already underway to implement one. Several days after the lawsuit filing, DETR launched a website allowing gig workers and independent contractors to apply for unemployment benefits, although people subsequently complained of error messages. By the end of May 2020, unemployment had reached 28 percent, the worst for any state since the Bureau of Labor Statistics began tracking such data in 1976.

In June 2020, a phone line went live for DETR that would allow gig workers to discuss issues in acquiring benefits. However, many people complained of busy lines and an inability to get in contact with DETR. In Las Vegas, protests were held against DETR over its slow response. DETR stated that it was working to improve its system and that, "Nearly 500,000 Nevadans have filed for unemployment insurance since the start of the COVID-19 pandemic. Prior to COVID-19, DETR received about 2,000 claims per week, and we are now receiving 2,000 per day." The agency stated that some unpaid claims were difficult cases to resolve due to disputes about employer separation.

Later in June 2020, Korbulic announced she would leave her position after receiving threats from upset people who had yet to receive unemployment benefits. A lawsuit was filed later that month, asking that a court order the state to pay unemployment benefits to individuals who had yet to receive them. DETR stated that such individuals were ineligible for Pandemic Unemployment Assistance (PUA), part of the CARES Act, but the suit alleged that DETR was misinterpreting guidance from the United States Department of Labor regarding PUA.

Sisolak named Elisa Cafferata as acting director of DETR in August 2020. Cafferata acknowledged complaints regarding Alorica's customer service call center. In September 2020, she announced that the state would terminate its contract with Alorica in 30 days, allowing DETR to directly take over call-center operations for improved service. During the first half of 2021, Las Vegas' unemployment rate fluctuated between 9 and 9.5 percent, the highest in the country. By July 2022, Nevada had recovered all of the jobs that were lost due to the pandemic, faring better than other parts of the U.S. where unemployment remained an issue.

Voting

Primary election
Barbara Cegavske, the Secretary of State of Nevada, announced on March 24, 2020, that the state would seek to conduct its June primary election almost entirely through absentee voting because of concerns about the coronavirus. Absentee ballots would be mailed to all active voters, and Nevada would join a growing number of states that planned to participate largely in absentee voting during the pandemic. Because of the pandemic, it was determined that each county would have only one in-person polling location.

In April 2020, Democrats filed a lawsuit against Cegavske, seeking additional polling locations for the primary election, and requesting that a ban on ballot harvesting be lifted to better assist voters. The suit also requested that absentee ballots not be rejected on the basis of mismatched signatures, stating that election officials did not have the necessary training to verify signatures and that mismatched signatures would not hamper the integrity of the election. True the Vote, a conservative group, filed a different lawsuit against Cegavske later that month. The group alleged that mass mail-in voting would lead to voter fraud, although proven cases of such fraud are rare.

A judge ruled against True the Vote and declined to issue an injunction, stating that Cegavske's actions to protect voters "far outweigh any burden on Plaintiffs' right to vote, particularly when that burden is premised on a speculative claim of voter fraud". The judge also determined that Cegavske had taken adequate precautions to prevent such fraud. The Democrat lawsuit was settled; three polling places were set up in Clark County, and the county agreed to send mail-in ballots to all registered voters, rather than just active voters. Nevada Republicans sought records from the Clark County Commission regarding the decision, stating that a public meeting should have been held. True the Vote filed a revised complaint in May 2020, saying that Clark County's voting procedures during the pandemic would give residents there an unfair advantage over those in other parts of the state. The judge allowed the primary to proceed with its mail-in aspect in place.

U.S. president Donald Trump was a longtime critic of mail-in ballots, saying that they encourage voter fraud. In May 2020, Trump expressed displeasure with the idea of Nevada's mail-in voting, writing on Twitter: "State of Nevada 'thinks' that they can send out illegal vote by mail ballots, creating a great Voter Fraud scenario for the State and the U.S. They can't! If they do, 'I think' I can hold up funds to the State. Sorry, but you must not cheat in elections." Nevada Democrats criticized Trump's comment, including Sisolak, who said, "For the President to threaten federal funding in the midst of a pandemic over a state exercising its authority to run elections in a safe and legal manner is inappropriate and outrageous."

Nevada held its primary election on June 9, 2020. Despite the mail-in ballots, long lines still formed in Reno and the Las Vegas Valley, carrying over into early the next day. In-person voting accounted for 1.6 percent of all the votes cast in the primary, compared with 34.2 percent in the 2018 Nevada elections. The final results of the primary took 10 days to be released, due to the large number of mailed-in absentee votes. It was later confirmed that more than 223,000 mailed primary ballots had been returned to Clark County as undeliverable, out of 1.3 million ballots. However, there were no confirmed cases of fraud in the primary.

Presidential election
On August 3, 2020, Sisolak signed legislation to provide mail-in ballots to all of the state's active voters for the 2020 United States presidential election, becoming the eighth state to do so. The move was meant to protect residents from catching COVID-19, by minimizing the amount of in-person voting. Cegavske, the only Republican to hold state office, said she had no knowledge of the ballot bill until she saw a draft of it, a day before the Nevada Assembly voted on it. She criticized the Democrat-controlled Nevada Legislature for excluding her from discussions about the bill, and said it would cost an additional $3 million to implement it.

On August 4, 2020, in response to the state's mail-in ballot plan, Trump's lawyers filed a lawsuit against Cegavske on behalf of his presidential re-election campaign and the Republican Party. Trump believed that mail-in voting could compromise the integrity of the presidential election. Large-scale mail voting was common in other states where the mail-in system was developed over a period of years, unlike Nevada. Trump claimed on Twitter, "Nevada has ZERO infrastructure for Mail-In Voting. It will be a corrupt disaster if not ended by the Courts. It will take months, or years, to figure out." However, the United States Postal Service (USPS) informed the state that there should be sufficient time for voters to cast their ballots by mail. Nevada was one of four states not warned by the USPS about possible mail-in issues. A judge eventually dismissed Trump's lawsuit.

During August 2020, Cegavske sought an emergency regulation from Sisolak for more oversight over ballot harvesting. Sisolak denied the request, calling it an attempt to use "the emergency regulation process for what appears to be political reasons." Meanwhile, Clark County's registrar of voters announced plans to reduce in-person voting locations from 159 to 125. The reduction was due to difficulty recruiting workers to staff the locations. State law required that the county have at least 100 in-person locations. Trump ultimately lost the election to Joe Biden. Cegavske's office concluded an investigation in April 2021, finding no evidence to support allegations of widespread voter fraud.

See also
 Timeline of the COVID-19 pandemic in the United States
 COVID-19 pandemic in the United States – for impact on the country
 COVID-19 pandemic – for impact on other countries
 U.S. state and local government responses to the COVID-19 pandemic

References

External links 

 Coronavirus information from the Nevada Department of Health and Human Services

Nevada
coronavirus pandemic
coronavirus pandemic
Disasters in Nevada
Health in Nevada